The  Canon EF 600mm is a super-telephoto lens made by Canon Inc. The lens has an EF mount to work with the EOS line of cameras.

4L USM lens was released in November 1988 (923,000 yen).
4L IS USM lens was released in September 1999 (1,290,000 yen).
4L IS II USM lens was announced in February 2011 (US$12,999 at release, now US$11,499).
4L IS III USM lens was announced in September 2018 (US$12,999).

All lenses are compatible with the Canon Extender EF teleconverters.

Specifications

References

External links

600